Dighton Rock State Park is a public recreation area and historic preserve located on the eastern shore of the Taunton River in the town of Berkley, Massachusetts. The  state park is the site of a small museum that houses the Dighton Rock, an  glacial erratic, covered with petroglyphs, that once sat on the banks of the river. It is managed by the Massachusetts Department of Conservation and Recreation.

Park history
From 1889 to 1955, the park was owned and managed by the Old Colony Historical Society. It was acquired by the state in 1955.

Activities and amenities
In addition to the museum, which is only open by appointment, the park features non-motorized boating, fishing, picnicking, and trails that are used for hiking, biking, and cross-country skiing.

References

External links
Dighton Rock State Park Department of Conservation and Recreation

State parks of Massachusetts
Parks in Bristol County, Massachusetts
Museums in Bristol County, Massachusetts
Berkley, Massachusetts
1955 establishments in Massachusetts
Protected areas established in 1955